Guido Lanfranco, MQR (18 October 1930 – 8 September 2021) was a Maltese writer on natural history and folklore.

Early life and education 
Lanfranco was born in Sliema, Malta, on 18 October 1930. He was educated at Stella Maris College and St. Michaels College of Education. He pursued other courses at the University of Malta and Dale Field Studies Centre in Wales.

Career 
Lanfranco was a teacher in various schools and a member of many educational boards and committees as well as local and foreign scientific societies. He was the first president of the Natural History Society of Malta, the Din L-Art Ħelwa and various other societies, and president of the Malta Folklore Society.

Awards and honours 
He was awarded the Bronze Medal of Merit by the Conference of Civic Councils in 1969, and the Midalja għall-Qadi tar-Repubblika (M.Q.R.) in 1996.

In 2004 Lanfranco won the annual Literary Prize on Folklore awarded by the Maltese National Book Council.

Other achievements 
Lanfranco organized various exhibitions, mostly on flora, fauna, geology, science and folklore. Many of his publications and articles, illustrated by himself, were published in local and foreign papers, magazines and journals. He also wrote and lectured on Maltese history. He organized many exhibitions and gave numerous lectures on natural history, archeology, and geology.

Publications 

 Guide to the Flora of Malta (1955, 1969), 
 A Guide to the Fishes of Malta (1958, 1965, 1974), 
 Duwa u Semm fil-Ħxejjex Maltin (1975), 
 Lampuki u Ħut: Ġabra ta’ riċetti u informazzjoni (1989) 
  (1993, 2000).

Family 

Lanfranco was married to Salvina Bonnici; they had two children, Sandro and Graziella.

Death 
Lanfranco died on 8 September 2021, at the age of 90.

Sources 
The Times of Malta, 21 September 1968, page 2

References 

 

Maltese male writers
1930 births
2021 deaths
People from Sliema
University of Malta alumni
Recipients of the Medal of Merit (Malta)
Recipients of the National Book Prize
Maltese non-fiction writers
Male non-fiction writers
English-language writers from Malta
Maltese folklorists